Klaus Jürgen Hopt (born 24 August 1940, in Tuttlingen) is a German lawyer and prominent representative of German commercial law.

Life
In addition to his academic activities, Klaus J. Hopt has also been active and active.

From 1981 to 1985 he was a judge at the Oberlandesgericht Stuttgart. From 1995 to 2001 he was a member of the former Takeover Commission; since 2002, he has been a member of the Takeover Board, which has been replaced by the Takeover Board, pursuant to § 5 of the German Securities Acquisition and Takeover Act (WpÜG) at the German Federal Financial Supervisory Authority (Bundesanstalt für Finanzdienstleistungsaufsicht). Since 2000, Hopt has been a member of the deputy of the German Juristage Day (DJT). In addition, he was a member of the High Level Group of Company Law Experts for the European Commission in Brussels from 2001 to 2002. In 2002, Hopt was chairman of the department of economic law (investor protection) of the 64th DJT in Berlin. Since 2002, he has been a member of the Börsensachverständungskommission and was also vice-president of the German Research Association from 2002 to 2008. From 2003 to 2006, he served as chairman of the Scientific Council of the Max Planck Society and from 2003 to 2005 as a member of the supervisory board of Deutsche Börse AG. In 2004, he was deputy chairman of the retirement department of the 65th DJT in Bonn, and in 2008 he was chairman of the 67th DJT in Erfurt.

In addition, he was an expert for the German Bundestag (Legal Committee, Committee on Economic Affairs, Finance Committee, Committee on Transport, Building and Housing), before the Federal Constitutional Court, the Federal Ministry of Finance, the Federal Ministry of Justice, and the Federal Ministry of Economics and Technology, the Bundesbank, the European Commission, the Bank for International Settlements, Bulgaria and the World Bank.

Together with his wife, Klaus J. Hopt established the Hopt Nguyen Foundation in 1996, which serves both charitable and scientific purposes. Among other things, various projects were supported in Vietnam, including day-care centers and homes for the disabled as well as a development program for the vocational training of young girls and women

References

20th-century German lawyers
Jurists from Baden-Württemberg
1940 births
Living people
People from Tuttlingen
Max Planck Institute directors